This article discusses the conjugation of verbs in a number of varieties of the Occitan language, including Old Occitan and Catalan. Each verbal form is accompanied by its phonetic transcription. The similarities with Catalan are more noticeable in the written forms than in pronunciation.

First group verbs (-ar verbs)
This is the group most Occitan verbs belong to. Examples include aimar ("to love"), esperar ("to wait" and "to hope"), manjar ("to eat") and pensar ("to think").

Parlar ("to speak")
Note: Because the Languedocian dialect is often considered as a basis for standard Occitan, it is colored gold.

Portar ("to carry")
This verb is conjugated like parlar; but in the first-person singular, second-person singular, third-person singular, and third-person plural present (both indicative and subjunctive) and second-person singular imperative tenses, its stems changed to pòrt- (pòrti). This change also happened on verbs such as cremar where the stems change to crèm- (crèmi). However, most of the online sources most likely only give the conjugations in the Languedocian dialect.

Second group verbs (-ir verbs)
This is the second regular group of verbs, and also the second largest. Examples include finir ("to finish"), partir ("to leave"), fugir ("to flee") and morir ("to die"). Even though the latter three normally give part, fug and mòr at the third person singular of present indicative, in a number of parts of Occitania they will also be declined using the -iss- augment, thus giving partís, fugís and morís.

Verbs with one stem: sentir ("to feel")
Note: Because the Languedocian dialect is often considered as a basis for standard Occitan, the standard is colored gold.

Verbs with two stems: bastir ("to build")

These verbs have a basic stem (bast-) and an extended stem (bastiss-), in which the augment -iss- derives from the Latin inchoative suffix -esc-.

Third group verbs (-re verbs)
This is the third regular group of verbs in the Occitan language. The letter immediately before the -re ending is always a consonant. Examples include pèrdre ("to lose"), recebre ("to receive"), medre ("to harvest") and sègre ("to follow"). If the consonant is a b or a g, then the third person singular of present indicative will be spelt with a p or a c instead. Consequently, recebre and sègre will give recep and sèc while pèrdre and medre will become pèrd and med, respectively.

Batre ("to beat")
Note: Because the Languedocian dialect is often considered as a basis for standard Occitan, the standard is colored gold.

Irregular verbs

Èsser ("to be")
Note: Because the Languedocian dialect is often considered as a basis for standard Occitan, the standard is colored gold.

Aver ("to have")

Anar ("to go")

Far ("to do")

See also
Occitan phonology
Romance verbs
Catalan conjugation

Literature
Frederic Mistral: Lou Tresor dóu Felibrige
François Juste Marie Raynouard: Grammaire romane, ou Grammaire de la langue des troubadours
Camille Chabaneau: Grammaire limousine: phonétique, parties du discours, 1876
F. Guessard: Grammaires provençales de Hugues Faidit et de Raymond Vidal de Besaudun (XIIIe siècle), 1858
Carl Appel: Provenzalische Chrestomathie, mit Abriss der Formenlehre und Glossar, 1902
C. H. Grandgent: An outline of the phonology and morphology of old Provençal, 1905

External links
http://occitanet.free.fr/ling/conjocreg.htm
http://monoccitania.50webs.com/conjugasons.html
https://www.verbix.com/languages/occitan

Occitan language
Indo-European verbs